Victoria Grace Ford (née Pollock, 21 September 1967) is a British  Conservative Party politician who served as Minister of State for Development from 6 September to 25 October 2022. She has served as the Member of Parliament (MP) for Chelmsford since 2017. She is a former investment banker, district councillor, and was a Member of the European Parliament (MEP) for the East of England from 2009 to 2017. 

Ford served as a Minister in the Department for Education from 2020 to 2021 before moving to the Foreign, Commonwealth and Development Office, in the government led by Boris Johnson. In September 2022, she was promoted by new Prime Minister Liz Truss to Minister of State for Development. She returned to the backbenches on 25 October 2022, resigning shortly after Liz Truss resigned as prime minister.

Early life and career
Victoria Grace Pollock was born on 21 September 1967 in Omagh, County Tyrone, Northern Ireland, to Anthony and Deborah Marion Pollock. Her parents were both English doctors. As a child, she joined her mother campaigning with the peace movement and her father stood in local elections for the Alliance Party of Northern Ireland.

She attended primary school and Omagh Academy in Northern Ireland, but following her father's death, she went to schools in England. Ford was educated at independent St Paul's Girls' School, independent Marlborough College and then studied Maths and Economics at Trinity College, Cambridge.

Between 1989 and 2001, Ford worked for JPMorgan Chase. She was promoted to vice-president in their loan syndication department. In 2001, she joined Bear Stearns as managing director for loan capital markets where she worked until 2003.

Political career
Ford joined the Conservative Party in 1986. In 2006, Ford was elected as a local councillor, representing Balsham Ward at South Cambridgeshire District Council. She was a parliamentary candidate in the 2005 general election for Birmingham Northfield constituency, but lost to incumbent Labour Party MP Richard Burden.

In 2007, she was a major contributor to the Conservative Party's review of UK taxation "The Tax Reform Commission".

Member of the European Parliament
Ford was elected as Conservative Party Member of the European Parliament for East of England in the 2009 European Parliament election. She was a member of the Bureau of the European Conservatives and Reformists Group and a member of the Parliament's delegation for relations with China.

As an MEP, Ford was the rapporteur for the Parliament on reforms to firearms laws, offshore oil and gas safety and the fiscal framework directive which seeks to increase transparency and accountability of public spending. She was a lead negotiator on the Horizon 2020 fund for research and on bank capital requirements, deposit guarantee schemes and residential mortgages.

From 2009 to 2014 she was a member of the European Parliament Committee on Industry, Research and Energy and the European Parliament Committee on Economic and Monetary Affairs.

From 2014 to 2017 she was Chair of the European Parliament Committee on the Internal Market and Consumer Protection, an economic committees of the Parliament, focusing on digital policy and unlocking trade opportunities for services and goods.

In 2016, Ford was ranked as one of the top ten most influential members of the European Parliament by Politico Europe, particularly for her work on digital policy.

Member of Parliament
Ford was elected as the Conservative Member of Parliament for Chelmsford at the 2017 general election. On 21 June 2017, Ford made her maiden speech in the Queen's speech debate, the first of the 2017 intake to do so.  In the 2017–19 parliament she served on the Science and Technology and the Women and Equalities select committees.

In August 2018 Ford was appointed as Parliamentary Private Secretary to the Foreign and Commonwealth Office ministerial team. In August 2019, she became Parliamentary Private Secretary to Alok Sharma,  the Secretary of State for International Development.

In the February 2020 cabinet reshuffle, Ford was appointed as the Minister for Children; a Parliamentary Under-Secretary of State at the Department for Education, with responsibility for children and families.

In the September 2021 Cabinet reshuffle, Ford ceased to serve as Minister for Children and became the new Parliamentary Under-Secretary of State for Africa at the Foreign, Commonwealth and Development Office. In January 2022, she issued a statement condemning the 2022 Burkinabé coup d'état.

Ford was appointed Minister of State for Development, attending cabinet, by the incoming Prime Minister Liz Truss on 6 September 2022, and was appointed to the Privy Council on 13 September 2022  She left her post on 25 October when Rishi Sunak became Prime Minister and returned to the backbenches.

Personal life
Vicky married Hugo Ford in 1996. They have three children. The couple met at the University of Cambridge, where she was a student at Trinity College and he was a student at Magdalene College. He is an oncologist and is the director of cancer services at Addenbrooke's Hospital in Cambridge.

Notes

References

External links 

Living people
1967 births
Alumni of Trinity College, Cambridge
People from Omagh
People from Chelmsford
Conservative Party (UK) MEPs
Councillors in Cambridgeshire
MEPs for England 2009–2014
MEPs for England 2014–2019
People educated at St Paul's Girls' School
People educated at Marlborough College
UK MPs 2017–2019
21st-century women MEPs for England
UK MPs 2019–present
Conservative Party (UK) MPs for English constituencies
Female members of the Parliament of the United Kingdom for English constituencies
Women councillors in England
Members of the Privy Council of the United Kingdom